Liu Lizhi ((?–?)) was a Chinese government official of the Song Dynasty.

Biography 
Gaoyou Jun zhi mou jun sh
guo zi jian bo shi
Fujian Lu lu ti dian xing yu gong shi
Nanling xian ling
da li si cheng
Lianjiang xian wei
Jinhuazhi mou xian shi
Run Zhou zhi mou zhou jun zhou shi
Qingxi xian zhu bu
Yizhou Lu zhuan yun shi
shang shu sheng xing bu bi bu si yuan wai lang
shang shu sheng gong bu yu bu si yuan wai lang
Lu Zhou tong pan mou zhou jun zhou shi
shang shu sheng li bu zhu ke si lang zhong
Jinghu bei Lu zhuan yun shi
san si du zhi gou yuan
san si yan tie pan guan.

Family 
father: Liu Shi (Chinese:劉式)
son: Liu Chang (Chinese:劉敞)
son: Liu Ban (Chinese:劉攽)
son: Liu Fang (Chinese:劉放)
son-in-law: Zhang Feng (Chinese:張諷)
father-in-law: Wang Li (Chinese:王礪)
Nephew: Liu Yu (Chinese:劉敔)
wife: Wang Shi (Chinese:王氏-劉立之妻)

External links

Song dynasty politicians from Jiangxi
Politicians from Yichun, Jiangxi
Year of birth unknown
Year of death unknown